Paul Weel (born 21 July 1979) is an Australian racing driver with experience in the V8 Supercars and Boost Mobile Super Trucks.

As a V8 Supercars driver, he raced 12 seasons in the series with a best finish of third at the 2003 Clipsal 500; he initially finished fourth, but a penalty for Russell Ingall promoted Weel onto the podium. His best enduro finish was a 5th at the 2002 Queensland 500 and best Bathurst 1000 finish was 8th in 1999.

From 2006, he decided to retire from full-time driving to devote more time to his PWR Performance Products business. On 10 October 2008, Weel was involved in a massive crash during a practice session at Bathurst; his stopped car was hit by Chris Pither in the Reid Park sector, leading to back fractures, a split spleen, and punctured lung. In 2009, he participated in the Sepang 12 Hours and finished fifth overall.

In 2020, Weel returned to driving when he joined the Boost Mobile Super Trucks. He continued to race in the series in 2021. At Hidden Valley Raceway in June, his truck flipped multiple times after making contact with Dave Casey on a ramp. The following month at Reid Park Street Circuit saw him win the final two races for his first career overall weekend victory.

He lives on the Gold Coast.

Career results

Complete Bathurst 1000 results

Boost Mobile Super Trucks
(key) (Bold – Pole position. Italics – Fastest qualifier. * – Most laps led.)

 Season in progress.
 Standings were not recorded by the series for the 2020 season.

References

External links
McConville replaces Weel at Supercheap Auto racing
Driver Database stats

1979 births
Australian Touring Car Championship drivers
Living people
Sportspeople from Geelong
Racing drivers from Victoria (Australia)
Supercars Championship drivers
Stadium Super Trucks drivers